Jo Jihun (December 3, 1920 – May 17, 1968) was a Korean poet, critic, and activist.

Life
Jo Jihun was born on December 3, 1920, in Yeongyang, Gyeongsangbuk-do, during the period of Japanese rule. His birthname was Jo Dong-tak. He graduated from Hyehwa College in 1941 with a degree in Liberal Arts. He taught at Odaesan Buddhist College and in 1946, after Korean Liberation, founded the Association of Young Writers (Cheongnyeon munhakga hyeophoe). Jo also served as president of the Society of Korean Poets(Hanguk Siin hyeophoe) and from 1947 served as a professor at Korea University. Jo Jihun was also the first head of the Korea University National Culture Research Institute. He died on May 17, 1968.

Jo Jihun's birthplace is preserved in Irwol-myeon in Yeongyang. A memorial to him stands on Namsan in Seoul.

Work
Of Jo Jihun's writing, the Korea Literature Translation Institute writes::Fine classical beauty of Korea expressed in this work evokes within the reader a feeling of peace and tranquility. "The Grief of Phoenix" (Bonghwangsu), while keenly describing several secrets of the architectural beauty of the palace, contrasts those who held sovereign power in the Joseon era with the intellectuals of the colonial period, exposing the pain and tragic feelings of governed classes. These first poems of Cho Jihun, capturing the lyrical expression of Korea's traditional and national consciousness, are contained in 'The Blue Deer Anthology' (Cheongrokjip), a joint collection shared with two others, Pak Tu-jin and Park Mok-wol.:Directly after Liberation, contemporary Cho Jihun emphasized that only those who guarded a purely poetic aesthetic could be considered poets, and asserted that the protection of individual freedom and the quest for the liberation of human nature was the essence of poetry. This literary purity and nationalistic fervor are proclaimed in the poet’s patriotic voice in his anthology, 'Standing Before History' (Yeoksa apeseo). The work criticizes, with a lucid historical consciousness, the political corruption and social irrationality engendered by the national division and internal strife of the day. In particular, "Dabuwoneseo" is one of the finest examples of war poetry that keenly depicts the tragic state of internal strife based on a personal experience.

The Nun's Dance
Jo Jihun's early love of Korean tradition is expressed in his poem "The Nun's Dance" (승무(僧舞).

The origin of the dance antedates the introduction of Buddhism into Korea and expresses the traditional Korean philosophy of the harmony of heaven and earth. Popularly, however, it is taken to represent the inner conflict of an apostate nun, or the sorrow of a beautiful woman's renunciation of her erotic past, which the poet references. The dancer Han Yong-Suk used to claim that it was her performance which inspired the poet, after he had watched it many times.

Works in Translation
 Brother Enemy (한국전쟁 시선집)

Works in Korean (partial)
Criticism
 A Theory on History of Korean Culture
Anthologies
 The Blue Deer
 Short Lines over Grasses:풀잎 단장(斷章)
 Selected Poems of Jo Jihun
 Stand Before History
 Lingering Resonance
 Stylish Antique Costumes:고풍의상(古風依裳)

Essays
 Leaning against the Window 
 Poetry and Life
 Theory of Integrity
 Aesthetics of Rocks.

Awards
Literature Prize of the Free Writers' Association, 1956

See also
List of Korean-language poets
Korean poetry
Korean literature
Society of Korean Poets

References

External links
 Yeongyang Jihun Literary House  

1920 births
1968 deaths
South Korean male poets
20th-century South Korean poets
20th-century male writers